Mark Goddard (born Charles Harvey Goddard; July 24, 1936) is an American actor who has starred in a number of television programs. He is probably best known for portraying Major Don West in the CBS series Lost in Space (1965–1968). He also played Detective Sgt. Chris Ballard, in The Detectives, starring Robert Taylor.

Early life
Charles Harvey Goddard was born in Lowell, Massachusetts, the youngest of five children, and grew up in Scituate. He was raised Catholic.

He led both his high school baseball and basketball teams to the state championship finals. Goddard dreamed of becoming a basketball player, but eventually turned to acting. He originally attended Holy Cross College after high school, but he then transferred and studied at the American Academy of Dramatic Arts in New York City. After two years, he moved to Los Angeles.

Career
In 1959, after just three weeks in Hollywood, he landed a role in the CBS Four Star Television series Johnny Ringo, having played the character of Cully, the deputy to Don Durant's character of Ringo. At this time, he changed his name to Mark Goddard at the suggestion of his friend and mentor Chuck Connors of The Rifleman. Goddard appeared as Norman Tabor in the 1960 episode "Surprise Party" of the CBS anthology series The DuPont Show with June Allyson. He was cast as Sheldon Hollingsworth in the 1960 episode "To See the Elephant" of the ABC Western series The Rebel, starring Nick Adams. He played Tod Rowland in the 1960 episode "The Mormons" on Dick Powell's Zane Grey Theatre.

The Detectives, another production of Four Star Television, was a hit series which ran on ABC and NBC from 1958 to 1961;
Goddard was signed for a role lasting three years (64 episodes). In 1963, Goddard appeared as Roy Mooney on the Perry Mason episode "The Case of the Potted Planter". In 1964 Goddard appeared as Richard on The Virginian in the episode titled "The Secret of Brynmar Hall."  That same year he guest starred as a wild killer named “Boyd” in the episode “Journey For Three” on the TV Western series Gunsmoke (S9E36).

In 1965, he played Lester Crawford in another Perry Mason, "The Case of the Frustrated Folk Singer". He also appeared with Keir Dullea as sparring college roommates in an episode of ABC's drama series Channing, costarring Jason Evers and Henry Jones. He was featured in the 1965 film A Rage to Live, starring Suzanne Pleshette. From 1964 to 1965, Goddard starred in Many Happy Returns, in which he portrayed Bob Randall, the young husband of Joan Randall, played by Elinor Donahue.

Lost in Space
Goddard's next role was Major Don West on Lost in Space (1965–1968). A blossoming romance initially existed between West and Judy, the elder daughter of the Robinson family, but by the middle of the second season, West maintained an adversarial relationship with the hapless, sociopathic Dr. Zachary Smith.

On October 16, 1997, Goddard and the rest of the surviving cast appeared on the inside cover of TV Guide to promote the feature film of Lost in Space. Goddard, along with Harris and the rest of his cast, were planning in 2002 for the movie Lost in Space: The Journey Home to air on NBC, which never came to fruition.

Later acting career
Goddard guest-starred on three ABC series, The Fugitive, The Mod Squad, and The Fall Guy and for a while, moonlighted as a Hollywood agent. In 1976, he starred as politician Edward Fleming in the movie Blue Sunshine. In 1970, Goddard co-starred with Kent McCord and Martin Milner in an episode of Adam-12, in which he plays a friend of Pete Malloy (Milner), who is killed in the line of duty. The episode was titled "Elegy for a Pig" (so titled and announced by Jack Webb himself). 
Mark Goddard also played Ellie May's beau on the Beverly Hillbillies.
Goddard played a supporting role in a 1974 episode ("Dark Legacy") of CBS's Barnaby Jones.

Goddard played a supporting role as an attorney in a first-season episode of NBC's Quincy M.E..

In 1978, Goddard starred with Liza Minnelli on Broadway in the musical The Act.

In 1979, Goddard was in the disco movie Roller Boogie featuring Linda Blair and Jim Bray and starred as Ted Clayton on One Life to Live and Lt. Paul Reed on The Doctors. Later, he starred as Derek Barrington on General Hospital. He made a cameo appearance in the reboot film Lost in Space (1998) as the general in charge of the Jupiter Mission and superior officer to his former character Major Don West.

Personal life
Goddard finished college 30 years after beginning his studies and received his master's degree in education from Bridgewater State College. From 1991 through at least 2009, he served as a special education teacher at the F.L. Chamberlain School in Middleboro, Massachusetts, where he taught an acting class. In 2009, he released an autobiographical memoir To Space and Back. While at Bridgewater State College, he met his third wife, English professor Evelyn Pezzulich. The couple has one child, John. His second wife, actress Susan Anspach, brought two children to their marriage. Goddard's first marriage was to Marcia Rogers in 1960 lasting until their divorce in 1968, and the couple had two children, Melissa and Michael.

See also

References

External links

  2009 Interview with Mark Goddard
 Golden Wheel Saloon -- showcasing Mark Goddard/Johnny Ringo

1936 births
Living people
20th-century American male actors
Actors from Lowell, Massachusetts
American Academy of Dramatic Arts alumni
American educators
American male film actors
American male soap opera actors
American male television actors
Bridgewater State University alumni
College of the Holy Cross alumni
Former Roman Catholics
People from Scituate, Massachusetts